Marco is the fourth studio album by Dutch artist Marco Borsato. It was released on 17 September 1994 through Polydor Records.

Track listing

Personnel
Credits for Marco adapted from discogs.com.

 Marco Borsato – lead vocals
 Kees ten Dam – saxophone
 John Ewbank – lyrics, music, production, arrangements, keyboards, piano, additional vocals
 Jody's Singers – background vocals
 Arnold Mühren – additional vocals
 Patrick Mühren – drums, percussion, mixing
 Stylus Horns – horns
 Jan Tekstra – acoustic guitar, bass
 Rob Winter – guitar
 Hans van Eijck- production, lyrics, composer

Chart performance

Weekly charts

Year-end charts

Certifications

References

1994 albums
Marco Borsato albums